Karafuto Prefecture (樺太庁 Karafuto-chō), commonly called South Sakhalin, was the Japanese administrative division corresponding to Japanese territory on southern Sakhalin island from 1905 to 1945.

Karafuto may also refer to:
Karafuto, a Japanese name of Sakhalin, now an island in Russia
Karafuto Fortress, the defensive unit formed by the Karafuto fortification installations, and the Karafuto detachment of Japanese forces in Karafuto Prefecture
Karafuto Shrine, a Shinto shrine in Toyohara, Karafuto Prefecture

See also
Karafuto-Ken or Sakhalin Husky, a breed of dog used as a sled dog  
Karafuto 1945 Summer Hyosetsu no Mon, 1974 Japanese film based on the Soviet Union's military action on Karafuto during the Soviet–Japanese War near the end of World War II